Ísafjörður Airport  is an airport serving Ísafjörður, a town in the Westfjords region in northwestern Iceland.

History
Planning for the airport started in 1958 construction of the runway started the same year. It was originally 1.100 meters long and the cost of the construction was 4.8 million ISK. It was formally opened on 2 October 1960 with Gljáfaxi, a Douglas DC-3 from Flugfélag Íslands, being the first plane to land on the airport.

Approach
Located in a fjord, the approach to the runway requires aircraft to fly close to the surrounding terrain, making it unique and more challenging than at most airports. Approaches generally cannot be straight-in for either direction, and when landing to the northeast, a full 180 degree turn must be made before touchdown. The sharp turn and the approach is featured as one of the landing challenges in Microsoft Flight Simulator 2020.

Airlines and destinations

Statistics

Passengers and movements

Incidents
On 20 March 1982, the left engine of Flugleiðir's Fokker F27 Friendship, with registration TL-FLM, blew up during takeoff from Ísafjörður Airport, at the altitude of 490 feet. The pilots managed to put out the fire but could not lower the left landing gear due to the damage it sustained in the explosion. Instead of trying to land on the narrow Ísafjörður airport with only two wheels down, the captain decided to fly about 230 km to the much larger Keflavík Airport to attempt an emergency landing there. Despite the front part of the engine almost breaking off in the explosion, the plane managed to land in Keflavík with minimal additional damage to the plane. All 25 people on board survived without injuries.

See also 
 Transport in Iceland
 List of airports in Iceland

Notes

References

External links

 Extreme Airport Approach video
 Official approach documentation
 OpenStreetMap - Ísafjörður

Airports in Iceland